The SEI CERT Coding Standards are software coding standards developed by the CERT Coordination Center to improve the safety, reliability, and security of software systems. Individual standards are offered for C, C++, Java, Android OS, and Perl.

Guidelines in the CERT C Secure Coding Standard are cross-referenced with several other standards including Common Weakness Enumeration (CWE) entries and MISRA.

See also
Common Vulnerabilities and Exposures
National Vulnerability Database

References

External links
 
 CERT home page
 2016 SEI CERT C Coding Standard
 2016 SEI CERT C++ Coding Standard

Computer standards
C (programming language) 
Carnegie Mellon University software
Computer network security